Frank Whiting Youngfleish (May 7, 1897 – January 21, 1953) was a professional football player from Pottsville, Pennsylvania, who played during the early years of the National Football League. After graduation from Villanova, he joined his hometown Pottsville Maroons for two seasons in 1926 and 1927.

References

External links
 

1897 births
1953 deaths
American football centers
American football guards
Pottsville Maroons players
Villanova Wildcats football players
Sportspeople from Pottsville, Pennsylvania
Players of American football from Pennsylvania